Jassem Al-Sharshani (born 2 January 2003), is a Qatari professional footballer who plays as a midfielder for Qatar Stars League side Al Ahli.

Career
Al-Sharshani started his career at the youth team of Al Ahli and represented the club at every level.

Career statistics

Club

Notes

References

External links
 

2003 births
Living people
Qatari footballers
Association football midfielders
Aspire Academy (Qatar) players
Al Ahli SC (Doha) players
Qatar Stars League players
Qatar youth international footballers